The Highlands Herald is a newspaper in the town of Waterval Boven, Mpumalanga, in South Africa. It was founded in 1997.

The paper has not appear in print neither has its blog/site been updated since March 2012.

Defunct newspapers published in South Africa